Qowsheh or Qusheh, also rendered as Qosheh may refer to:

Qowsheh-ye Olya, Ardabil Province
Qowsheh-ye Sofla, Ardabil Province
Qowsheh Qui, Qazvin Province
Qusheh, Semnan Province